Andrea Feltrini, called also Andrea di Cosimo, was a Florentine painter who excelled in grotesques. He was born on 12 March 1477, and died on 12 May 1548. His works are to be met with at Florence on the fronts of houses, on walls, and on ceilings. He is called by the first name, from his having been a scholar of Morto da Feltre, and by the second from his having studied art under Cosimo Roselli.

References

Attribution:
 

1477 births
1548 deaths
Grotesque
Painters from Florence
15th-century Italian painters
Italian male painters
16th-century Italian painters